is a Japanese voice actress.

Filmography

Anime series
Sacred Seven, Manami
Kin-iro Mosaic, Alice Cartelet
Bladedance of Elementalers, Carol Natassha
Recently, My Sister is Unusual, Ayaka Tachibana
Shimajirō no Wow!, Snow Rabbit
Strike the Blood, Minami Shindō
The Comic Artist and His Assistants, Matome Minano
Absolute Duo, Otoha Kokonoe
Hello!! Kin-iro Mosaic, Alice Cartelet
Rilu Rilu Fairilu ~Yousei no Door~, Ofuku-san
Keijo, Kaho Fuyuzora

Video games
Rage of Bahamut (2014), Connie

 Uchi no Hime-sama ga Ichiban Kawaii (2014), Anna

 Dream C Club Gogo (2014), Chiri

 Kirara Fantasia (2017), Solt, Alice Cartelet

 Granblue Fantasy, Suframare

Dubbing roles

Live Action
Just Add Magic – Hannah Parker-Kent (Aubrey Miller)

Other
CeVIO AI Talk voice and Synthesizer V voice provider, Tsurumaki Maki

References

External links 
 
 Manami Tanaka Profile at Production Baobab

Japanese voice actresses
Living people
Male voice actors from Hiroshima Prefecture
1989 births
21st-century Japanese actresses
Production Baobab voice actors